Federico Acuña Araújo is a Paraguayan politician. He briefly served as Interior Minister under President Fernando Lugo in 2011, from 17 June to 25 August. He had previously been Chief of the National Police from 19 August 2008 to 24 November 2008.

Biography
He was born in San Pedro del Paraná. In 2009, he was accused by former Interior Minister Rafael Filizzola of turning a blind eye to corruption during his tenure as Police Chief.

References

Living people
Interior Ministers of Paraguay
People from Itapúa Department
Year of birth missing (living people)